The Misanthropic Luciferian Order (MLO) was a satanic occult order founded in Sweden in 1995 and later renamed Temple of the Black Light. It had originally three members, Vlad Nemisis Khosnood, Jon Nödveidt and another member who left the group early. Vlad's girlfriend later became a supporting member. The group never grew beyond this size again after two earlier friends had dropped out. As a sign of membership the three had a symbol tattooed on the arms, of a so-called "vampire pentagram" that Vlad had designed. 

The MLO released Liber Azerate, a modern grimoire written by the founder Vlad Nemisis Khosnood, whose title was Magister Templi and nicknamed Frater Nemidial, in 2002. It was released on the internet in Swedish and Norwegian. Azerate is the hidden name of the "eleven anti-cosmic gods" described in the book. A related musical work is the 2006 Dissection album Reinkaos, the lyrics of which were co-written by Vlad, and which Jon Nödtveidt explained was "based on the book Liber Azerate and the teachings of MLO". The MLO propagate "Chaos-Gnostic Satanism" or "Current 218".

In 2010, a second book named Liber Falxifer was published. It is also a grimoire with spells, and commentary about Latin American death cults. It was published by Ixaxaar Publications, in limited editions.

Beliefs
The MLO believes in what they titled "Chaosophy", they believe in the Jewish and Biblical creation theory of Adam and Eve and the existence of the abrahamic God, or Yehowa, that according to them created the universe, but unlike followers of the abrahamitic faiths, they instead reject Yehowa and wants to see this creation not to have taken place, and wishes to destroy it or cause it's non-existence through magic and rituals. They believe that chaos is an infinidimensional and pandimensional plane of possibilities, in contrast to cosmos which only has three spatial dimensions and one linear time dimension. They also believe that, in comparison with the linear time of cosmos, chaos can be described as timeless in the way that it is not contained nor limited by one-dimensional time, and formless, because of its ever-changing and infinite number of space dimensions.

Militant neo-gnosticism and misanthropy is taught within the group, and they say that the true Satanist must not be a part of the modern society, as it is founded upon lies. The very fabric of this reality is a lie that hinders chaos from realizing itself.

These are the three dark veils before Satan, in their belief system seen as the three forces that were expelled from Ain Sof in order to make way for the manifestation of the "Black Light" in the "outer darkness" that soon became Sitra Ahra:
000 - Tohu - Formless chaos: Qemetiel ("crown of gods")
00 - Bohu - Emptiness/Nothingness: Beliaal ("without god")
0 - Chasek - Darkness: Aathiel ("uncertainty")

These three powers can be seen as the burning trident held high above the Thaumielitan. These three powers can also be viewed as wrathful reflections of Ain, Ain Soaf, and Ain Soaf Aur.

Criminal activities

In the summer of 1997, Josef Ben Meddour was murdered by members Vlad and his accomplice Jon Nödtveidt. This act was described by the police to be a homophobic hate crime. When Nödveidt and Vlad were arrested for the crime respectively on the 15th and 18 December 1997, the police discovered satanic altars in the homes of the two suspects. A human skull was also found at Vlad's place, for which he was charged with possession of human parts. According to the police, the cult never had more than a handful of followers.
During their investigations, the police interrogated the early former member of the MLO, and Vlad's girlfriend (who had reported him for aggravated domestic abuse) who described the organisation and narrated the occult ceremonies they had attended. Rituals included meditation, invocations of demons, and animal sacrifices– namely cats, which Vlad bought through classified ads. During the weeks that preceded the murder of Josef ben Meddour, Vlad had been more and more extremist in his speech, and the idea of performing human sacrifices, followed by a mass suicide, was discussed at length. During a meeting at Nödtveidt's place, a list of possible victims was made. It included the former follower who had defected, band members from Dissection, and even Nödtveidt's girlfriend.
These plans led to the defection of some members of the MLO, who did not want to take part in any assassination, or who feared for their own lives. As a result, when the arrests were made, the number of active members was down to three: Nödtveidt, Vlad, and Vlad's girlfriend.
The two were sentenced to prison for the murder, and released after seven years.
In 2006, Nödtveidt killed himself in his apartment. His body was found with candles and Liber Azerate.

See also 
 Magical organization

Notes

References

Sources 
 P3 dokumentär om mordet i Keillers Park. On 24 March 2013, the Swedish radio station P3 broadcast a documentary produced by Ida Lundqvist on the Keillers Park murder.
 Satanistmordet i Keillers Park. An article written by criminal inspector Lars Ohlin, who led the investigation, originally published in the book Nordisk kriminalkrönika 1999. It was reproduced in issue #31/2012 of the magazine Veckans brott.

Satanism
Black metal
1995 establishments in Sweden
Gnosticism
Crime in Sweden
Religion in Sweden